The TVR Chimaera is a two-seater roadster sports car manufactured by TVR between 1992 and 2003. The name was derived from Chimera, the monstrous creature of Greek mythology, which was made of the parts of multiple animals.

First debuted at the 1992 Earl's Court Motor Show, the Chimaera used the same backbone chassis as the Griffith and used the same derivatives of the Rover V8 engine. The car was intended to be the long distance tourer of the range and as such was longer, more spacious and had slightly softer suspension than its sister car.

Specifications

Engine

90 degree aluminium V8

All engines are based on the 3.5 L Rover V8 unit, with increased displacement on the later models.

Suspension
The suspension consisted of all round independent, unequal-length double wishbones and coil over gas dampers assisted by anti-roll bars.

Braking
Both sets were servo assisted with front/rear split dual circuits. There was a cable-operated hand brake for the rear wheels.

Steering

Steering was optionally power-assisted and worked via rack and pinion with adjustable steering column. There were 2.2 turns lock to lock for the power-assisted steering or 2.5 for unassisted. The standard fit was by Personal, in keeping with a majority of TVR models.

Manufacturer's options

Power assisted steering
Air conditioning
Rear speakers
Six CD autochanger
Full leather
Heated Seats
Wood and Chrome Steering Wheel
Wool Carpets
Gold coloured badges
Seven spoke 'Griffith 500' wheels for smaller engine versions (standard on 5.0)
4,988 cc V8 (5.0) initially a factory option on the 4.3 and 4.5 litre models

Model year changes 

The Chimaera was originally intended to replace the Griffith but sufficient demand for both of the models led TVR continuing them.  In 1994, TVR introduced the Chimaera 500, a high performance derivative of the Chimaera. The BorgWarner T5 manual transmission replaced the Rover LT77 unit on the rest of the range. A new alternator, power steering and a single Vee belt were fitted to improve reliability. The 4.3 litre engine option was replaced by the 4.0 litre High Compression option. The Chimaera was mildly updated in 1996. Updates included a rear bumper shared with the Cerbera, push button doors with the buttons located under the wing mirrors, a boot lid shared with the Cerbera and the replacement of the front mesh grille with a horizontal bar. The GKN differential was also replaced by a BTR unit.  

A 4.5 litre model was added to the lineup in 1997. It was originally intended to be fitted with the AJP8 V8 engine but due to the engine not being ready on time, a bored version of the Rover V8 was used instead. In 1998, the rear light styling and the number plate mounting angle was updated while the base 4.0 litre model was discontinued. In 2001, the Chimaera was again facelifted and now featured the Griffith's headlights as well as seats from the Cerbera. The Chimaera was succeeded by the Tamora in 2002.

References

External links

TVR Chimaera Pages - A guide to ownership and maintenance of the TVR Chimaera. Includes a gallery of pictures.
TVR Chimaera review on Pistonheads
TVR Chimaera buyer's guide
 TVR Chimaera pictures, specifications etc.
- TVR Chimaera 500 site, Includes a gallery of pictures & video.

Chimaera
Sports cars
Rear-wheel-drive vehicles
Coupés
2000s cars
Cars introduced in 1992
Automobiles with backbone chassis